The 2020–21 UEFA Nations League D was the fourth and lowest division of the 2020–21 edition of the UEFA Nations League, the second season of the international football competition involving the men's national teams of the 55 member associations of UEFA.

Format
Following a format change from the first season, League D was reduced from 16 to 7 teams. The league consisted of the lowest ranked UEFA members from 49–55 in the 2018–19 UEFA Nations League overall ranking, who were split into two groups (one group of four teams and one group of three teams). Each team played four or six matches within their group, using the home-and-away round-robin format on double matchdays in September, October and November 2020. The winners of both groups were promoted to the 2022–23 UEFA Nations League C.

Teams

Team changes
The following were the team changes of League D from the 2018–19 season:

The following team changes were initially set to occur in League D, but did not after no teams were relegated due to the format change by UEFA:

Seeding
In the 2020–21 access list, UEFA ranked teams based on the 2018–19 Nations League overall ranking. The seeding pots for the league phase were confirmed 4 December 2019, and were based on the access list ranking.

The draw for the league phase took place at the Beurs van Berlage Conference Centre in Amsterdam, Netherlands on 3 March 2020, 18:00 CET. Group D1 contained two teams from Pot 1 and two teams from Pot 2, while Group D2 contained two teams from Pot 1 and one team from Pot 2.

Groups
The original fixture list was confirmed by UEFA on 3 March 2020 following the draw. On 17 June 2020, the UEFA Executive Committee adjusted the league phase schedule for October and November 2020 to allow for the completion of the UEFA Euro 2020 qualifying play-offs. Following the change, a revised schedule for the October and November 2020 fixtures was released by UEFA on 26 June 2020.

Times are CET/CEST, as listed by UEFA (local times, if different, are in parentheses).

Group 1

Group 2

Goalscorers

Overall ranking
The seven League D teams were ranked 49th to 55th overall in the 2020–21 UEFA Nations League according to the following rules:
The teams finishing first in the groups were ranked 49th to 50th according to the results of the league phase, not taking into account results against the fourth-placed team.
The teams finishing second in the groups were ranked 51st to 52nd according to the results of the league phase, not taking into account results against the fourth-placed team.
The teams finishing third in the groups were ranked 53rd to 54th according to the results of the league phase, not taking into account results against the fourth-placed team.
The team finishing fourth in Group D1 was ranked 55th.

Notes

References

External links

League D